Adeliini Viereck, 1918 is a tribe of braconid parasitoid wasps within the subfamily Cheloninae. Until 2016, Adeliini was classified as a separate subfamily, the Adeliinae. However, the name Adeliini Kirby, 1828 for a tribe of beetles has priority, and Adeliini Viereck, 1918 is a junior homonym.

Description and distribution
Adeliini are small, non-cyclostome braconids with the first two to four tergites fused to form a carapace. Wing veination is relatively reduced compared to other Chelonines.

Biology
Adeliini are koinobiont endoparasitoids of leaf-mining moths in the family Nepticulidae.

References

External links
 DNA barcodes at BOLD systems

Braconidae
Parasitica tribes